The Ischia Film Festival is an annual film festival held in Ischia, Italy.

The 20th edition will start on Saturday, June 25 and end on July 2, 2022 under the artistic direction of the founder Michelangelo Messina. The international competition for featured films, short films and documentaries is particularly devoted to film locations.

Organizers 
Artistic Director: Michelangelo Messina
Artistic Consultant: Gianni Canova
Coordinator: Enny Mazzella
Press Office: 
Guest Coordinator: Sara Messina

References

External links

Film festivals in Italy